A & R Recording Inc. was a major American independent studio recording company founded in 1958 by Jack Arnold and Phil Ramone.

History 
Before founding A & R Recording in 1958, Arnold and Ramone had been working at JAC Recording, Inc.; Arnold had been a partner at JAC. The "A" and "R" initials were derived from their surnames. But also, Arnold and Ramone relished the idea that their initials and company name matched the industry acronym for "artist and repertoire," an important avocation in the recording industry.

Jack Arnold ended his association with A & R Recording shortly after co-founding it, due to health issues.

Original A & R studio – 112 West 48th Street
The original studio was in Midtown Manhattan, New York City, on the fourth floor of Mogull's Film & TV building at 112 West 48th Street. The studio was named "Studio A1." Manny's—a music instrument retailer—was one-half of the first three floors; Mogull's Film & TV was the other half. Jim and Andy's Bar, an important hangout for studio musicians was next door at 116 West 48th Street. Ramone installed an intercom from the studio to Jim & Andy's to call for musicians if someone did not show-up.

In the first studio, Ramone gained a reputation as a good sound engineer and music producer, in particular for his use of innovative technology. According to David Simons, author, the original studio at 112 West 48th St., which was started on a shoestring budget, remains Ramone's greatest legacy.

The studio was designed for the purpose of doing demos. In a short period of time, Ramone felt the need to upgrade the equipment.

Second studio, Studios A-1 and A-2 – 799 7th Avenue
In October 1967, A & R purchased Columbia's Studio A on the seventh floor at 799 7th Avenue at 52nd Street and leased the space, which consisted of about  Columbia had owned the studio since 1939. The building was demolished in 1983 to make way for Equitable Center West at 787 7th Avenue, currently the BNP Paribas Building. Toronto-born Donald C. Hahn (né Donald Clarence Hahn; 1939–2020), who had been with A & R since 1961, was – effective October 1, 1969 – promoted from Senior Engineer to Vice President of A & R Recording, in charge of supervising the 799 7th Avenue facilities.

 Capacities, as published in 1974:
 Studio A-1: 40 × 50 feet; height 30 feet –  – accommodated 90 people
 Studio A-2: 25 × 30 feet; height 12 feet –  – accommodated 20 people

Third studio, Studios R-1 and R-2 – 322 West 48th Street 
A & R added a third studio in the Leeds Music Corporation building at 322 West 48th Street. A & R became part owner of the building, a 6-story building, and designed recording studios on the first and second floors, named R1 and R2, respectively. The "R" stood for "Ramone." A & R also occupied the basement. 322 West 48th Street is currently the home of American Federation of Musicians Local 802, the New York City musicians' union and the Jazz Foundation of America.
 Capacities, as published in 1974:
 Studio R-1: 38 × 28 feet; height 13-3/4 feet –  – accommodated 26 people
 Studio R-2: 20 × 25 feet; height 13 feet –  – accommodated 12 people

Launch of A & R Records 
In February 1970, A & R Recording launched A & R Records, a company that produced albums of artists that included Paul Simon, Billy Joel, George Barnes (musician) and Bucky Pizzarelli.

Satellite studios 
In 1970, A & R Recording formalized two partnerships to build two satellite studios, one with Brooks Arthur (né Arnold Brodsky; born 1936) in Blauvelt, New York, and one with Norman (Norm) Fuller Vincent (1930–2014) in Jacksonville, Florida.

914 Sound Studios
The partnership with Arthur was named "914 SRS" and was located at 34 NY Route 303 in Blauvelt. "SRS stood for "Sound Recording Studios." The legal structure of the partnership was in the form of a New York corporation operating as a wholly owned subsidiary of A & R Recording Inc. The entity name was "914 Sound Recording Studios, Inc." The studio, a converted gas station, opened October 1970. Arthur owned one-half; Ramone, Don Frey, and Arthur Downs Ward (1922–2002) owned the other half. They sold it in 1978 and the corporation—914 Sound Recording Studios, Inc.—dissolved in 1982.

Vincent SRS 
The partnership with Norman Vincent, et al. was named "Vincent SRS" and was located in Jacksonville, Florida, and opened November 1970. Vincent was the operator.

Closing
A & R Recording closed in 1989.

Selected artists 
Artists produced by Ramone include

 Clay Aiken
 Burt Bacharach
 The Band
 Bono
 Laura Branigan
 Ray Charles
 Karen Carpenter
 Chicago
 Peter Cincotti
 Natalie Cole
 Chick Corea
 Bob Dylan
 Sheena Easton
 Melissa Errico
 Gloria Estefan
 Aretha Franklin
 Billy Joel
 Elton John
 Quincy Jones
 Patricia Kaas
 B.B. King
 Julian Lennon
 Shelby Lynne
 Madonna
 Barry Manilow
 Richard Marx
 Paul McCartney
 George Michael
 Liza Minnelli
 Anne Murray
 Olivia Newton-John
 Sinéad O'Connor
 Fito Páez
 Luciano Pavarotti
 Peter, Paul, and Mary
 June Pointer
 André Previn
 Diane Schuur
 Michael Sembello
 Carly Simon
 Paul Simon
 Frank Sinatra
 Rod Stewart
 James Taylor
 The Guess Who
 Frankie Valli
 Dionne Warwick
 Stevie Wonder
 Nikki Yanofsky

Neighborhood 
In a 10-block area of midtown Manhattan during the disco era, there was Media Recording, Hit Factory, Sony, and A&R Recording had two buildings. And last but certainly not least, Record Plant Recording studios @ 321 W. 44th Street, with four studios, duplication room, two mobile recording trucks, and the master cutting room, and the Record Plant Shop.

 A & R Recording Inc.112 West 48th StreetOpened by Jack Arnold and Phil Ramone 1959. Corner of 6th Avenue, next door to Jim & Andy's Bar (116 West 48th Street) and Manny's Music (156 West 48th Street), both famous musicians hangouts. Used regularly by Tom Dowd for Atlantic sessions and producer Creed Taylor for Verve. Van Morrison recorded "Brown Eyed Girl" there.
 A & R Studio 2 (formerly Columbia Studio A)799 7th AvenueOpened by Jack Arnold and Phil Ramone early 1968
 Associated Sound (now Quad Recording Studios)723 7th AvenueNear corner of West 48th Street, a few doors down from Dick Charles. The Angels' "My Boyfriend's Back," the Raindrops'"What A Guy" and The McCoys' "Hang On Sloopy" were cut there
 Bell Sound (later The Hit Factory)237 West 54th StreetFounded June 1950 by Allen Weintraub and Daniel Cronin (1929–1968), both classmates from Brooklyn Technical High School; studio was located at 135 West 54 beginning June 1959; Burt Bacharach's favorite studio. Bought by Jerry Ragovoy 1968 and reopened as The Hit Factory; sold 1975 to partner Eddie Germano (né Edward F. Germano; 1941–2003); now run by Troy George Germano (born 1962), his son
 Capitol Studios, Studio A (Capitol Records, Inc.)(the studio operated under Capitol from 1949 to 1961)151 West 46th StreetFirst floor (one floor up) in the 14-story Eaves Building (built in 1928). The Eaves Costume Company – founded by Albert Grammer Eaves (1847–1900) in 1863 ( years ago), and still in existence – occupied the ground floor.
 Century Sound135 West 52nd StreetOne flight up. Former radio studio. Opened by Brooks Arthur in 1967
 Columbia 30th Street207 East 30th StreetConverted Armenian church. Opened 1949, closed mid-1982, torn-down, now an apartment building
 Columbia Studio A (later A & R Studio R2)799 7th AvenueOpened in the 1930s. Columbia's main facility prior to East 30th Street. Sold to A & R late 1967
 Columbia Studio B49 East 52nd StreetFormer site of CBS Radio Network building, near Madison Avenue. Opened late 1967
 Dick Charles729 7th AvenueSmall demo studio, near corner of West 48th Street, a few doors up from Associated. Many of S'pop's favored songwriters recorded demos there
 Mira Sound145-155 West 47th StreetOn the ground floor of the Hotel America, now a Euro-style hotel. Recorded there: "Remember (Walking in the Sand)" by The Shangri-Las and "Society's Child" by Janis Ian
 The Power Station (now Avatar Studios)441 West 53rd StreetNear 10th Avenue. Founded 1977 by Tony Bongiovi. Previously home to ConEdison (hence Power Station)
 RCA155 East 24th StreetNear Lexington Avenue
 RCA Webster Hall125 11th StreetIn the East Village. Built late 1800s. Converted by RCA early 1950s. Now a nightclub
 The Record Plant (later Streetlight)321 West 44th StreetOnce home to Warner Brothers Pictures; opened by Gary Kellgren and Chris Stone in 1968
 Stea-Philips7th AvenueCorner 51st Street, close to Columbia Studio A and 1650 Broadway. Owner: Lenny Stea (né Leonard J. Stea; born 1928). The Four Seasons cut "Sherry" there
 Talentmasters Recording Studio126 West 42nd StreetOwners: Bob Gallo and Robert (Bob) Harvey. Later bought out by AtlanticThe Who recorded there
 World United1595 BroadwayOwner: Harry Lookofsky, aka Hash Brown, father of Michael Brown of The Left Banke, who recorded "Walk Away Renée" there
 JAC Recording, Inc.152 West 58th StreetOwner: Charles LeightonThis is where Phil Ramone got his start
 Allegro Sound Studios1650 BroadwayOwner (original): Kama Sutra Records This was actually on the 51st Street side of the 1650 Broadway building, located in the basement, around the corner from the famous jazz club Birdland. Originally a demo studio for Kama Sutra, it was then purchased by Laurie Records, who gave it an extensive upgrade under chief engineer Bruce Staple. After several changes in ownership, it became known as Generation Sound Studios in the 1970s. Many of the Tommy James hits were recorded there, including I Think We're Alone Now and Crimson And Clover. After the departure of Bruce Staple, Tony May of A&R became chief engineer.

Personnel 
In 1972, management of A & R included Robert Gerics (general manager & studio manager), Nick Diminno (studio manager), and Irving Joel (chief engineer). The studio was located at 322 West 48th Street.

Management and shareholders

 Recording Inc.

 
 
 
 
 

 Records (subsidiary)

 
 
 

 Engineers

 Brooks Arthur, engineer
 Roy Cicala, engineer
 Ami Hadani
 David Greene, engineer, producer
 Roy Halley, engineer
 Tom Hidley
 
 Bob Ludwig, mastering engineer
 Tony May, engineer
 
 
 
 
 Fred Weinberg, engineer, producer
 
 Shelly Yakus, engineer

Studio managers
 Nick Diminno, studio manager
 Robert Gerics, general manager & studio manager
 Mitch Plotkin, studio manager

Bibliography

Annotations

Notes

References

   Note: Addey is a prolific recording studio audio engineer known for is work with The Beatles at Abbey Road Studios.

  

  

  

  

  

  

 

  

  

 

  

  ; .

 

  ;  (pdf copy).

  ; ; .

  

  

  ; .

 

 

 

  ; ; .

  ; ; .
 
 
 

  

  ; ;  (Classic ed.);  (Delux ed.); .

   .

1958 establishments in New York City
1958 in New York City
1989 disestablishments in New York (state)
1989 in New York City
1980s in Manhattan
American companies established in 1958
American companies disestablished in 1989
Companies based in Manhattan
Defunct companies based in New York City
Entertainment companies based in New York City
New York (state) record labels
Record labels established in 1958
Record labels disestablished in 1989
Recording studios in Manhattan
Rhythm and blues record labels
Rock record labels
Pop record labels